The Scotsman Hotel Edinburgh opened in 2001 in the Edwardian (1905) building which had housed The Scotsman newspaper for nearly a century. The hotel is located on North Bridge between the Royal Mile and Princes Street, thereby straddling  Edinburgh’s Medieval Old Town and Georgian New Town.

Ownership 
The Scotsman was previously part of JJW Hotels & Resorts and was purchased by Sheikh Mohamed bin Issa Al Jaber for £63 million in 2006. In August 2007, JJW acquired The Eton Collection.

The hotel went into liquidation in June 2016 and was sold to the G1 Group for an undisclosed amount in February 2017.

Building history 
In the 1900s the North Bridge running between the New and Old Towns of Edinburgh was widened and as part of this expansion a 190-foot-high tower was built, into which The Scotsman newspaper moved their offices. The building cost around £500,000 and after the rest of the North Bridge extension was completed teamed with the Carlton directly opposite, it formed an imposing entrance to the Old Town.

The direct access from Market Street to the building was an ideal distribution outlet for the papers to be packed directly onto the trains at Edinburgh Waverley railway station straight from the printing house that took up the entire basement. The middle floors of the building were originally used for the editorial offices. The current penthouse used to be the Pigeon lofts. The site now occupied by the North Bridge Brasserie originally held the reception and trading rooms where bartering over advertising took place.

In 2001 the Newspaper moved to their own purpose built offices in Holyrood and the building was renovated into The Scotsman Hotel. In 2017, the hotel once again came under Scottish ownership when it was purchased by G1 Group, one of the countries largest hospitality groups. Now the companies flagship venue, the Hotel has spent several years going through a substantial refurbishment, which has seen all bedrooms upgraded and a boutique cinema added. Additionally, The Grand Cafe now occupies the former advertising offices of the building, serving brunch, afternoon tea and dinner to a soundtrack of live piano and jazz.

Ghosts
In a link to its time as former offices of the Edinburgh Evening News, the building is reported to be "haunted by a host of ghosts, including a phantom printer and a phantom forger."

Awards 
 Boutique Hotel Of The Year Award – 2020 Scottish Hotel Awards
 Hotel Design Gold Laurel – 2020 Scottish Hotel Awards
 Voted one of the top hotels in the world – Condé Nast Traveler, 2007
 Voted one of the top hotels in the world – Departures
 Nominated Hotel of the Year – The AA, 2002
 One of the Top UK Business Hotels – Condé Nast Traveler, 2007
 One of the Top 20 UK hotels – Tatler, 2004
 Simon Fraser was awarded Rising Star Restaurant Manager of the Year – Scottish Hotels of the Year Awards 2008
 Hotel is a member of The Preferred Hotel Group
 The hotel's North Bridge Brasserie has been awarded 1 Rosette

References

External links 
 Scotsman Hotel website

Victorian architecture in the United Kingdom
Hotels in Edinburgh
Listed hotels in Scotland
Category A listed buildings in Edinburgh
Reportedly haunted locations in Edinburgh
1902 establishments in Scotland
2001 establishments in Scotland
Hotels established in 2001
Office buildings in Scotland